A signal corps is a military branch, responsible for military communications (signals). Many countries maintain a signal corps, which is typically subordinate to a country's army.

Military communication usually consists of radio, telephone, and digital communications.

Asia
Rejimen Semboyan Diraja, Malaysian Royal Signals Regiment
Indian Army Corps of Signals, raised in 1911.
Pakistan Army Corps of Signals, raised in 1947.
Singapore Armed Forces Signals Formation
Sri Lanka Signals Corps
Israeli C4I Corps
Korps Perhubungan TNI AD (Indonesian Army Signal Corps)
Armed Forces of the Philippines Signal Corps
Signal Department, Royal Thai Army

Australia
Royal Australian Corps of Signals
Royal New Zealand Corps of Signals

Europe
Arma delle Trasmissioni, corps of Italian Army founded in 1953, see List of units of the Italian Army.
Royal Corps of Signals, founded in the United Kingdom (under the name Telegraph Battalion Royal Engineers) in 1884.
Communications and Information Services Corps (CIS), the signals corps of Ireland's Defence Forces.
Signal Brigade, a unit of the Serbian Armed Forces.
Telegrafregimentet, Royal Danish Signal Regiment.
Sambandsbataljonen in the Brigade Nord of the Norwegian Army
Regiment Verbindingstroepen, a regiment of the Royal Netherlands Army.
Fernmeldetruppe of Bundeswehr, before: Signal Corps of the Wehrmacht and Waffen SS.
Signal Communications Troops of Russia.
Signal Corps (French Army).
Viestirykmentti, Signal Regiment of the Finnish Army.
Swedish Army Signal Troops.

North America
Royal Canadian Corps of Signals, formed in 1903 as the Canadian Signalling Corps
Signal Corps (United States Army), founded in 1860 by Major Albert J. Myer

See also
Military communications
Telegraph troops

Combat support occupations